Třebíč is a transport hub of local importance. Třebíč is crossed by highways I/23 and II/360 and is an important stop on Brno-Jihlava railway line.

Road transport

 I/23 Pisárecký tunel – Kývalka – Třebíč – Předín (I/38) – Jindřichův Hradec – Písek
 II/351 Chotěboř - Třebíč - Dalešice
 II/360 Letohrad – Velké Meziříčí (D1) – Třebíč – Jaroměřice nad Rokytnou
 II/405 Jihlava – Brtnice – Třebíč
 II/410 Třebíč – Jemnice – state boundary of Austria

Since 2000 the reconstruction of II/360 road is being realized. This road will connect Třebíč to D1 motorway. Reconstruction was started in Trnava, where a new roundabout was constructed. Following phases of reconstruction will affect Oslavice, Oslavička and Velké Meziříčí.

Rail transport
The first nearby railway line, the mainline of Austrian Northwestern Railway built in 1871 has avoided the town because trains would have to descend to the Jihlava River valley and climb uphill again. A today railway station of Třebíč–Stařeč was then built. Třebíč got railway station within town limits in 1886 when Střelice-Okříšky segment of Bohemian-Moravian Transversal Railway line segment was built.

Třebíč is well connected with other cities by express trains running through the town once per hour in weekdays.

Public transport

Public transport first operated in Třebíč in 1871–1886 period when the railway station Třebíč–Stařeč was connected to the town by omnibus line. Bus transportation was re-established in 1956.

During the 1980s, the town planned to establish trolleybus network but the social changes after 1989 Velvet revolution stopped any actual actions.

Bus transport
In Třebíč there are nine bus lines. The lines with most ridership are numbered 1, 4 and 5. The most frequently used stops are Karlovo Square and Komenského Square.

Třebíč
Trebic